Buczyna may refer to the following places in Poland:
Buczyna, Lower Silesian Voivodeship (south-west Poland)
Buczyna, Lesser Poland Voivodeship (south Poland)
Buczyna, Świebodzin County in Lubusz Voivodeship (west Poland)
Buczyna, Wschowa County in Lubusz Voivodeship (west Poland)
Buczyna, West Pomeranian Voivodeship (north-west Poland)